Fatawu Abdulrahman (born 6 August 1995) is a Ghanaian professional footballer who plays as a midfielder for Ghanaian Premier League side Aduana Stars. He previously played for Techiman City. Abdulrahman won the Ghana Premier League in his debut season with Aduana Stars in 2017.

Club career

Techiman City 
Abdulrahman started his career with Bono East Region-side Techiman City. He played for them during the 2016 Ghanaian Premier League season, featuring in 18 league matches and scoring 3 goals in the process. Techiman City were relegated at the end of the season, but as one of the stand out players for the team, he became a transfer target for clubs within the Premier League.

Aduana Stars

2017–2019 
In January 2017, Abdulrahman joined fellow Ghana Premier League side Aduana Stars ahead of the 2017 Ghanaian Premier League season, after Techiman City were relegated from the Ghana Premier League. He made his debut on 13 April 2017 in a goalless draw against Wa All Stars, coming on in the 67th minute for Zakaria Mumuni. He went on a played 7 matches as Aduana won the Ghana Premier League. In the 2019 GFA Normalization Committee Special Competition, he played 12 matches and scored 4 goals. On 3 April 2019, Abdulrahman and Yahaya Mohammed scored a goal each to help Aduana to a 2–1 victory over Eleven Wonders.

2020– 
During the 2019–20 Ghana Premier League season, he played 4 league matches before the league was put on hold and later cancelled as a result of the COVID-19 pandemic. He was set to renew his contract with the club in December 2019, his contract was renewed as he stayed on to play in 2020. Ahead of the restart of the league for the 2020–21 Ghana Premier League season, he made the cut for the 30 man squad list. On 17 January 2021, he scored a goal to help Aduana secure a 2–1 victory over Legon Cities FC.

International career 
Abdulrahman received his maiden call-up to the Ghana Ghana A' national football team, the Black Stars B in August 2019. He however missed out on the squad for the 2019 WAFU Cup of Nations in Senegal in September 2019.

References

External links 

Living people
1995 births
Association football midfielders
Ghanaian footballers
Techiman City FC players
Aduana Stars F.C. players
Ghana Premier League players